Calliostoma vaubanoides is a species of sea snail, a marine gastropod mollusk, in the family Calliostomatidae within the superfamily Trochoidea, the top snails, turban snails and their allies.

Distribution
This species occurs in the Pacific Ocean off the Tonga Islands.

References

vaubanoides